The 1855 Connecticut gubernatorial election was held on April 2, 1855. Former state legislator and American Party nominee William T. Minor defeated former congressman and Democratic nominee Samuel Ingham and incumbent governor and Whig nominee Henry Dutton with 43.51% of the vote. 

The results reflected the national transition from the Second Party System to the Third Party System. The Know Nothings would win the first of two such elections, and the incumbent Whig Party's vote share collapsed, with Dutton finishing a distant third.

Although Minor won a plurality of the vote, he did not receive a majority. As a result, the Connecticut General Assembly elected the governor, per the state constitution. Minor won the vote over Ingham, 117 to 70, in the General Assembly, and became the governor.

General election

Candidates
Major party candidates

William T. Minor, American or Know Nothing
Samuel Ingham, Democratic
Henry Dutton, Whig

Results

References

1855
Connecticut
Gubernatorial